Miss Teen USA 1991, the 9th Miss Teen USA pageant, was televised live from the Mississippi Gulf Coast Coliseum in Biloxi, Mississippi on 19 August 1991.

At the conclusion of the final competition, Janel Bishop of New Hampshire was crowned by outgoing titleholder Bridgette Wilson of Oregon. Bishop is the first African American winner ever and the first titleholder from New Hampshire.

The pageant was hosted by Dick Clark (who last hosted it in 1988 and was already also hosting Miss USA & Miss Universe Pageants on CBS), with color commentary by Leeza Gibbons and Miss Teen USA 1985 Kelly Hu for the second time. Music was provided by the Gulf Coast Teen Orchestra.

This was the second of five years that the pageant was held in Biloxi. After the city hosted Miss Teen USA 1990, it entered negotiations with the Miss Universe company in October 1990 to host the pageant for a further four years, and an announcement to that effect was made in early November.

Results

Placements

Special awards

Historical significance 
 New Hampshire wins competition for the first time. Also becoming in the 8th state who wins Miss Teen USA.
 Georgia earns the 1st runner-up position for the first time.
 Missouri earns the 2nd runner-up position for the first time.
 Louisiana finishes as Top 6  for the first time.
 North Carolina finishes as Top 6  for the first time.
 North Dakota finishes as Top 6 for the first time. 
 States that placed in semifinals the previous year were Georgia, Louisiana, Massachusetts, Missouri and Texas. 
 Texas placed for the fourth consecutive year.
 Georgia, Louisiana, Massachusetts and Missouri made their second consecutive placement.
 North Dakota and Oklahoma last placed in 1989.
 North Carolina last placed in 1987.
 Indiana placed for the first time.
 Kansas placed for the first time.
 New Hampshire placed for the first time.
 Rhode Island placed for the first time.
 Kentucky breaks an ongoing streak of placements since 1989.
 Miss Rhode Island Teen USA: Gina Tognoni would go on to become a Three-time Daytime Emmy Award actress, as Dinah Marler on Guiding Light and Phyllis Summers on The Young And The Restless Where her younger sister was played by Jessica Collins - Miss New York Teen USA 1988, where she finished as 1st runner-up.

Delegates
The Miss Teen USA 1991 delegates were:

  Alabama - Stephanie Gwantley
  Alaska - Stacey Stewart
  Arizona - Christine Tulah
  Arkansas - Paula Montgomery
  California - Jolene Fulkner
  Colorado - Kiki Kianne Morricall
  Connecticut - Allison Benusis
  Delaware - Michelle Daulton
 District of Columbia - Marja Allen
  Florida - Marnie West
  Georgia - Meredith Young
  Hawaii - Trini-Ann Leilani Kaopuiki
  Idaho - Angelia Madrey
  Illinois - Kara Kline
  Indiana - Heather Hart
  Iowa - Tina Foehring
  Kansas - Denise Blatchford
  Kentucky - Christine Jaxman
  Louisiana - Allison MacIntyre
  Maine - Kerri Malinowski
  Maryland - Jennifer Wilhoit
  Massachusetts - Erinn Bartlett
  Michigan - Lori Hahnbomb
  Minnesota - Natasha Grinaski
  Mississippi - Jimmi Gliann
  Missouri - Audra Sherman
  Montana - Theresa Rosenbaum
  Nebraska - Erin Mouther
  Nevada - Brooke Hammond
  New Hampshire - Janel Bishop
  New Jersey - Keri Paarz
  New Mexico - Kimberly Apadocka
  New York -  Wendy Cooper
  North Carolina - Holly Furman
  North Dakota - Nicci Elkins
  Ohio - Michelle Mouser
  Oklahoma - Rachel Childers
  Oregon - Delilah Anderson
  Pennsylvania - Kimberly Parkis
  Rhode Island -  Gina Tognoni
  South Carolina - Jeanie Bowers
  South Dakota - Tabitha Moude
  Tennessee - Tris Sax
  Texas - Kara Williams
  Utah - Corrine Peterson
  Vermont - Anne-Marie Giroux
  Virginia - Linda Overhue
  Washington - Elizabeth Lee
  West Virginia - Tracey Rexroad
  Wisconsin - Pamela Shradder
  Wyoming - Britta Lund

References

1991
1991 beauty pageants
1991 in Mississippi